is a passenger railway station located in the city of Kōchi, the capital of Kōchi Prefecture, Japan. It is operated by JR Shikoku and has the station number "K03".

Lines

In addition to the local trains of the Dosan Line, the following limited express services also stop at Ino Station:

Layout
The station consists of two opposed side platforms serving two tracks. A mock-Tudor style station building connected to platform 1 houses a waiting room and JR ticket window (without Midori no Madoguchi facilities). Access to platform 2 is by a footbridge.

Adjacent stations

History
At this time the station was operated by Japanese Government Railways, later becoming Japanese National Railways (JNR). With the privatization of JNR on 1 April 1987, control of the station passed to JR Shikoku.

Connections

Surrounding area
Kochi Gakuen Junior College
Kochi Municipal Kyokuhigashi Elementary School

See also
List of railway stations in Japan

References

External links

timestable 

Railway stations in Kōchi Prefecture
Railway stations in Japan opened in 1924
Kōchi